Combi may refer to:

 Gianpiero Combi, an Italian footballer
 Combi aircraft, aircraft designed to carry both passengers and freight
 Combi boiler, a kind of central heating boiler which is popular in Europe
 Combi (car style), also known as a station wagon or estate car
 Combi coupé, a term used by Saab for some of its hatchback automobile models
 Combi steamer, an oven type used for baking with dry heat, steam heat, or a combination of both to yield humidity control
 Kia Combi or Asia Combi, a series of mini-buses built from 1983 to 2002
 Truvelo Combi, a model of camera used to measure vehicle speed

See also 

 Combo (disambiguation)
 Kombi (disambiguation)